The George Webster House is a historic mansion in Williamsport, Tennessee, USA.

History
The two-storey mansion was completed in 1844 for George Pope Webster. It was designed in the Federal architectural style. Webster was the owner of 75 African slaves.

The house was inherited by Mary Camp Webster and her husband, Hinton S. Frierson. It was later inherited by Adelaide Queener. It was purchased by Jane H. Babcock in 1980.

Architectural significance
The house has been listed on the National Register of Historic Places since April 5, 1984.

References

Houses on the National Register of Historic Places in Tennessee
Federal architecture in Tennessee
Houses completed in 1844
Houses in Maury County, Tennessee
National Register of Historic Places in Maury County, Tennessee